San Clemente High School is a high school in southern Orange County, California, in the town of San Clemente. San Clemente High's attendance boundaries include the City of San Clemente and parts of Capistrano Beach and San Juan Capistrano. The school has approximately 3000 students.

History 
The school opened in 1964, and the first graduating class was the class of 1965. The first class to have attended SCHS all four years graduated in 1967. In 1996, San Clemente High was noted as one of the few remaining “small town” high schools in Southern California. In 1999, the school was nominated as a National Blue Ribbon School by the U.S. Department of Education.

In 2007, San Clemente High School was ranked number 471 by Newsweek magazine. In 2012 it was ranked number 380.

In February 2012, an Orange County Sheriff's Department deputy shot and killed Marine Sergeant Manuel Loggins after Loggins failed to comply with the deputy's instructions while on school grounds. In 2013, the Orange Count Sheriff's Department settled with the Loggins family regarding a wrongful death lawsuit.

San Clemente's Academic Performance Index for the 2011–2012 school year was 844.

Academics
The school possesses a number of academic and vocational enrichment programs: the International Baccalaureate (IB) Program, the Advanced Placement program, Model United Nations, Model Congress, National Honor Society, California Scholarship Federation (CSF), National Merit Scholars, Early Childhood Education Academy, Automotive Technology Academy, the Regional Occupation Program (ROP), and Advancement Via Individual Determination (AVID) program.

The school offers the following Advanced Placement (AP) courses:
AP Economics (Macro and Micro), AP US History, AP Psychology, AP Environmental Science, AP Japanese Language, AP Biology, AP Chemistry, AP English Language and Composition, AP English Literature and Composition, AP European History, AP Art History, AP Spanish Language IV and V, AP Calculus AB, AP Calculus BC, and AP Statistics.

The school also offers the following International Baccalaureate (IB) courses:
IB Literature, IB Math Studies, IB Math (SL/HL), IB Latin American 20th Century, IB Economics, IB Biology, IB Chemistry, IB Environmental Studies, IB Physics (SL/HL), IB Languages (French, Japanese, Spanish), IB Dance (SL/HL), IB Music Appreciation (SL) and Music (SL/HL), IB Psychology, IB Theory of Knowledge (TOK).

The average class size is 35. The school has about 3,000 students and about 108 teachers. The percent of teachers with a full credential is 100%. The graduation rate as of 2012 is 98%.

The school also has an Academic Decathlon team, which competes against other schools in the OCAD association. They have a senior-junior team in first semester, and a sophomore-freshman team 2nd semester.

Sports
The school offers a variety of athletic teams, which include wrestling (three-time CIF champions), football (CIF champions), boys' and girls' tennis, surf team (national champions), boys' and girls' waterpolo (CIF champions) and swim teams, girls' soccer (nationally ranked), boys' soccer (two-time State Champions & three-time CIF champions), girls' and boys' basketball, girls and boys volleyball, cross-country and track, boys' and girls' lacrosse, boys/girls golf, boys' baseball, and girls' softball.

In 2006 the San Clemente Varsity cheer squad brought home a national championship, beating out 22 other teams.
The San Clemente Varsity wrestling team has won Southern CIF three times, two were back to back and were runner-up 2 times in a five-year period.

In 2003, the Tritons won the CIF Wrestling Academic Championship

In 2005, 2007 & 2009, the Tritons won three CIF Wrestling Championships and have won 15 Wrestling League Championships.

San Clemente Wrestling is the only team in Orange County that has had one or more CIF Place Winner every year since 1982.

In 2010, the San Clemente baseball team ranked 23rd in California, and 121st in the nation. The baseball team has more players playing at the next level (college) than any other sport in the school.

In 2016, San Clemente baseball team earned a national title after winning first place at the National Highschool Invitational (NHSI).

In 2010–2011 season, the San Clemente Boys' Soccer Team won both the CIF & State Championships.

In 2011, the San Clemente football team had a 12–2 overall record, ranking 5th in California, and 19th in the nation. They made it to the final round of CIF, before losing to Santa Margarita 13–27.

In 2014, San Clemente had its first ever state champion in track and field; Rocky Fenton produced a personal best throw of 184 ft 11 in the discus throw to win.

In 2016, San Clemente captured its first CIF-SS football championship in a 45-35 win over second-seeded Murrieta Valley in the CIF-SS Division 2 Final. The Tritons beat three seeded teams (No. 1 Heritage/Romoland, No. 4 Valencia, and No. 2 Murrieta Valley) on its way to the title. San Clemente had played in three consecutive CIF-SS football finals and five overall.

In 2016, San Clemente also captured a State Champion Division 1A title after defeating Del Oro High School 22-17 at Sacramento State University.

In 2018–2019 season, the San Clemente Boys' Soccer Team won both the CIF & State Championships with a 26-2-4 record and finished the season ranked #2 Nationally.

In 2019, San Clemente football team was disqualified from CIF playoffs prior to semi-final game due to ineligible player for contact with coach prior to enrollment. All wins in season were forfeited turning a 10-2 record into 0-13.

Fine arts
The Triton fine arts department includes: Triton Marching Alliance, Jazz Band, color guard, drumline, dance team, Women's Ensemble, Men's Ensemble, Bel Canto, A Capella, Madrigals, String Orchestra, Chamber Orchestra, Advanced Band, Symphony Orchestra, and Wind Ensemble.

The marching band is known as the Triton Marching Alliance. They compete in the 3A division SCJA. The winter guard team took home a second-place title at the WGASC Championship in 2011 creating a winning impression that lasted throughout the season with two first place titles and two 2nd place titles. In 2011, the Triton Marching Alliance was invited by the Governor of California to perform in the National Memorial Day parade in Washington D.C., in which San Clemente was one of two schools that represented California.

The choirs have performed in various venues ranging from New York's Carnegie Hall to the University of Hawaii. The choir department consists of three auditioned choirs (Madrigals, A Capella, and Bel Canto) and two beginner choirs (women's and men's ensemble). In 1999, an alumnus of the SCHS choir department died and left the music department with a donation of $10,000 in his will. That money continues to be used in rewarding students with exceptional talents in music in a manner that encourages their continuance of music in college.

The string and band department has played in venues across Europe and in New York and Hawaii.

The dance team in 2013 came home with three national champion titles for medium dance, intermediate dance, and best overall choreographed dance, marking its 14th national title in the last 10 years.

The drama department, which consists of hundreds of students as well as the parent booster club, was recognized with a Macy Award for the play Curtains.

Notable alumni

 Kolby Allard, professional baseball pitcher for Texas Rangers
 Coby Bell, television actor, Third Watch, The Game
 Tiffany Brissette, actress, Small Wonder
 Sam Darnold, New York Jets first round 2018 NFL Draft pick, quarterback
 Brian de la Puente (born 1985), NFL football player
 Connor De Phillippi, race car driver
 Jorge Garcia, actor, Lost
 Gabriel Gardner, member of 2008 Beijing Olympics men's volleyball team, gold medalist
 Sean Harlow, NFL guard for the Atlanta Falcons
 Megan Henderson, news anchor/reporter for KTLA television in Los Angeles
 Eric Hester, film composer
 Trevor Insley, wide receiver, Indianapolis Colts, 2000–2003
 Aaron Johnson, music producer of multi-platinum album How To Save A Life by The Fray and No. 1 self-titled follow-up
 Rian Johnson, director and screenwriter, notably Star Wars: The Last Jedi; most of his 2006 film Brick was filmed on and around school grounds
 Dean Karnazes, ultra-marathoner
 Masafumi Kawaguchi, football player, International Federation of American Football 1999 World Cup
 Tessa Keller, star of MTV's Laguna Beach: The Real Orange County
 Bill Kenney, quarterback, Kansas City Chiefs, 1980–1988
 Kian Lawley, YouTuber and actor
 Colin McPhillips, professional long boarder
 Wayne Miller, guitarist for metal band “Bleed The Sky”
 Kyle Murphy, offensive tackle for Green Bay Packers
 Edith Ramirez, chairwoman, Federal Trade Commission
 Chase Rettig, quarterback, Boston College and Green Bay Packers
 Ryan Sheckler, professional skateboarder
 Katie Vernola, Playboy Playmate, June 2010
 Rachel York, Broadway, film and television actress, original name Rachel Lemanski
 Danielle Weatherholt, Professional footballer

Notes

External links
 new school website
 District's SCHS website

High schools in Orange County, California
International Baccalaureate schools in California
Public high schools in California
1964 establishments in California
Educational institutions established in 1964